You Have the Right to Remain Silent... is the only studio album by the band X-Cops. It was released in 1995.

Track listing

Miscellanea
The photos on the inside of the CD booklet depict a murder crime scene being investigated by the X-Cops.  On the wall in the victim's room is a poster of Gwar, the X-Cops' (at the time secret) identity. The poster features the cover of Scumdogs of the Universe. The victim is also wearing GWAR shorts, which the band sold at concerts and through the back pages of their comic books in the 90s.

The song "Barbells" features lead vocals by Brad Roberts (Jizmak Da Gusha), "Zipper Pig" Bob Gorman (the muzzled slave), and "The Party's Over" with Dave Brockie (Oderus Urungus). All other songs that contain vocals ("Tune Up Time" is an instrumental) feature Casey Orr (Beefcake the Mighty).

1995 debut albums